A gig-mill (gigging machine, napping machine) was type of raising machine that used teasels to produce a nap on cloth. Examples of the results of gigging are woolen fabrics such as chinchilla, beaver cloth, and melton. The process involved gradual teasing of the surface to raise the nap.

Gigging
Gigging was an old method of raising. As with flannelette, the fabric surface is treated with sharp teasels during Gigging to elevate the surface fibers, providing hairiness and lustrous nap. The fabric gets a soft feel. Teasels from a plant, a thistle-like species, were once used to make it. These were fixed to a cylinder. Later, teasels were replaced by metallic wires similar to those used in carding machines.

Napped fabrics 

"Napping", "raising" and "gigging" are synonymous terms. Napping is the process of brushing for raising the nap. The raising method is used to draw out the ends of the fibers. Examples of napped fabrics include Brushed tricot, and Flannelette.

Nap
Nap in textiles refers to the raised surface.

Gallery

See also 

 Shearing (textiles)
 Aachen fine cloth

References 

Textiles
Textile techniques
Textile arts